Lecture Notes in Computer Science is a series of computer science books published by Springer Science+Business Media since 1973.

Overview
The series contains proceedings, post-proceedings, monographs, and Festschrifts. In addition, tutorials, state-of-the-art surveys, and "hot topics" are increasingly being included.

The series is indexed by DBLP.

See also
Monographiae Biologicae, another monograph series published by Springer Science+Business Media
Lecture Notes in Physics
Lecture Notes in Mathematics
Electronic Workshops in Computing, published by the British Computer Society

References

External links

Publications established in 1973
Computer science books
Series of non-fiction books
Springer Science+Business Media
Conference proceedings published in books